This is a list of dream pop artists. Individuals are alphabetized by their surname.

A–M

Air
All About Eve
Alvvays
A.R. Kane
Atlas Sound
Au Revoir Simone
The Autumns
Azure Ray
Basement Revolver
Bat for Lashes
Beach Fossils
Beach House
Bell Hollow
Belly
Blonde Redhead
The Boo Radleys
Braids
Broadcast
Candidate
Candy Claws
Catherine Wheel
Chapterhouse
Chromatics
Cigarettes After Sex
Cocteau Twins
Cranes
Julee Cruise
Curve
The Depreciation Guild
Devics
DIIV
Echo Lake
Elysian Fields
Engineers
Eskobar
Fear of Men
Field Mouse
For Against
For Tracy Hyde
Ghostly Kisses
Galaxie 500
Kenneth James Gibson
Girl in Red
Grimes
Hatchie
Her's
High Highs
The High Violets
The Hundred in the Hands
I Break Horses
The Innocence Mission
It Hugs Back
Jay Som
Jadu
jj
The Joy Formidable
Kitchens of Distinction
Lab Partners
Landing
Lana Del Rey
Letting Up Despite Great Faults
Lykke Li
Little Dragon
London Grammar
Lorde
Lovesliescrushing
Lower Dens
Lush
M83
Magic Wands
Mahogany
Mazzy Star
Medicine
Men I Trust
Mira
Mr Twin Sister
My Bloody Valentine

N–Z

The Nightblooms
The Ocean Blue
The One AM Radio
Pale Saints
Papercuts
Parannoul
Parekh & Singh
Parker and Lily
Plastic Flowers
Porcelain Raft
Purity Ring
The Raveonettes
Ride
Sarah P.
Say Lou Lou
School of Seven Bells
Secret Shine
Seely
Sigur Rós
Troye Sivan
Slowdive
Snakadaktal
Snow & Voices
Soundpool
Spirea X
Spotlight Kid
Still Corners
Sugar Plant
The Sundays
Sweet Trip
The Telescopes
This Mortal Coil
Trance to the Sun
Turnover
Vansire
Venus Hum
Vivian Girls
Warpaint
Washed Out
Wet
White Violet
Wild Nothing
The xx
Your Friend
The Zephyrs

See also
List of shoegaze musicians

References

Bibliography

Dream pop